Terebreno is a rural locality (a selo) and the administrative center of Terebrenskoye Rural Settlement, Krasnoyaruzhsky District, Belgorod Oblast, Russia. The population was 600 as of 2010. There are 9 streets.

Geography 
Terebreno is located 20 km southwest of Krasnaya Yaruga (the district's administrative centre) by road. Staroselye is the nearest rural locality.

References 

Rural localities in Krasnoyaruzhsky District